is a Japanese voice actress and singer affiliated with the agency Intention. Before joining Intention, she was affiliated with Arts Vision. She debuted as a voice actress in 2010, and played her first leading role as Kanon Nakagawa in The World God Only Knows. She is also known for her roles as Chitoge Kirisaki in Nisekoi, Yui Yuigahama in My Youth Romantic Comedy Is Wrong, As I Expected, Tomoe Koga in Rascal Does Not Dream of Bunny Girl Senpai, Karen Kujō in Kin-iro Mosaic, and Rin Shima in Laid-Back Camp. In 2019, she won the Best Supporting Actress Award with Yū Serizawa and the Game Award in the 13th Seiyu Awards.

Her music career began when she released songs for The World God Only Knows under her character name Kanon Nakagawa. She later made her solo debut as a 
singer on February 1, 2017, with the release of the double A-side single "True Destiny" / "Chain the World" under the Flying Dog label. She also voiced a member of the music unit Walküre, which performed songs as part of the Macross franchise.

Biography

Early life and education
Tōyama was born in Tokyo. Her father had spent nine years abroad and was fluent in English. From an early age she had an interest in anime, in particular the series Ojamajo Doremi and Sailor Moon. However, it was the anime series Fullmetal Alchemist that was the first to inspire her to become a voice actress. At the time, she was impressed that the series' protagonist Edward Elric was voiced by Romi Park.

While in junior high school and high school, she became part of a chorus club to help her overcome tone deafness. It was also during this time she decided to pursue a voice acting career, as she had interacted with schoolmates who had similar interests. Her parents approved of her decision, provided that she did well in university entrance exams. While in high school, she enrolled at the Japan Narration Acting Institute. After completing her training, she became affiliated with the voice acting agency Arts Vision.

Voice acting career
Tōyama made her voice acting debut, starring in the original video animation Hiyokoi. That same year, she played her first main role as Kanon Nakagawa in the anime series The World God Only Knows. The following year, she was cast as Yune in Croisée in a Foreign Labyrinth and Margot Knight in Horizon in the Middle of Nowhere.

In 2012, Tōyama played the roles of Shiori Terashima in Symphogear, Ako Atarashi in Saki, and Shino Enjōji in Kokoro Connect. The following year, she was cast as the characters Karen Kujō in Kin-iro Mosaic, Yukiho Kōsaka in Love Live!, Yui Yuigahama in My Teen Romantic Comedy SNAFU, and Mana Natsukawa in Oreshura. In 2014, she played the roles of Chitoge Kirisaki in Nisekoi, Kayo Gōtokuji in Sabagebu!, Himiko in Nobunaga the Fool, Momo Kawanagare in Ai Tenchi Muyo!, Sylvia Ikaruga Misurugi in Cross Ange, and Lieselotte Sherlock in Trinity Seven. That same year, she left Arts Vision and transferred to the agency Intention.

In 2015, Tōyama was cast as Mizuki Kawashima in The Idolmaster Cinderella Girls, Claudia Enfield in The Asterisk War, Lecty Eisenach in Sky Wizards Academy, and Shizuku Kurogane in Chivalry of a Failed Knight. The following year, she played the roles of Rin Suzunoki in Bakuon!!, Ami Kurata in Long Riders!, Reina Prowler in Macross Delta, Maria Imari in This Art Club Has a Problem!, and Nozomi Kasaki in Sound! Euphonium 2. In 2017, she played Ryōko Sonoda in Tsuki ga Kirei, and the following year, she voiced Rin Shima in Laid-Back Camp and Tomoe Koga in Rascal Does Not Dream of Bunny Girl Senpai.

Music career
In 2010, she released a number of singles and performed at various events for The World God Only Knows''' as Kanon Nakagawa. In 2014, she became part of the music group Rhodanthe*, which performs theme songs for the Kin-iro Mosaic series. She has also released singles as her Idolmaster character Mizuki Kawashima. In 2016, she voiced a member of the in-universe music group Walküre, which performed songs for the anime series Macross Delta.

Tōyama made her solo music debut with the release of her first single "True Destiny" / "Chain the world" on February 1, 2017. The song "True Destiny" was used as the ending theme of the anime television series Chain Chronicle ~Haecceitas no Hikari~, and "Chain the world" was used as the opening theme of its movie version. Her second single "Ima Koko" / "Tsuki ga Kirei" was released on May 24, 2017; the song "Ima Koko" was used as the opening theme to the anime series Tsuki ga Kirei, while the song "Tsuki ga Kirei" was used as the series' ending theme. She released her first album Rainbow on October 25, 2017. In February 2018, she held a solo concert at the Nippon Budokan. Her official fanclub, "Niji no Wakka", was launched on the same day. She released her third single "Tomoshibi no Manima ni" on May 30, 2018. She released her second album Gunjō Infinity on April 3, 2019. She released her fourth single "Aruiteikō!" on February 5, 2020; the title song is used as the opening theme of the anime series Asteroid in Love.

Filmography

Anime television

Original video animation (OVA)

Original net animation (ONA)

Theatrical animation

Video games

DubbingThe Dark Crystal: Age of Resistance'', Deet

Discography

Singles

Albums

Video releases

References

External links
  
 
 

1992 births
Living people
Arts Vision voice actors
Japanese women pop singers
Japanese video game actresses
Japanese voice actresses
Singers from Tokyo
Voice actresses from Tokyo
Waseda University alumni
21st-century Japanese actresses
21st-century Japanese women singers
21st-century Japanese singers